Abdi Pasha may refer to:

 Abdurrahman Abdi Arnavut Pasha (1616–1686), Ottoman governor of Baghdad, Egypt (1676–80), Bosnia (1680–82), and Budin (1682–86)
 Abdurrahman Abdi Pasha (court historian) (1630–1692), Ottoman official and historian
 Keki Abdi Pasha (died 1789), Ottoman governor of Aleppo (1784–85), Egypt (1788–89, 1789), and Diyarbekir
 Abdülkerim Nadir Pasha (1807–1883), Ottoman soldier, also known as Çırpanlı Abdi Pasha

See also
 Abdi, a male name
 Pasha, a title in the Ottoman political and military systems